= List of songs recorded by S. Janaki =

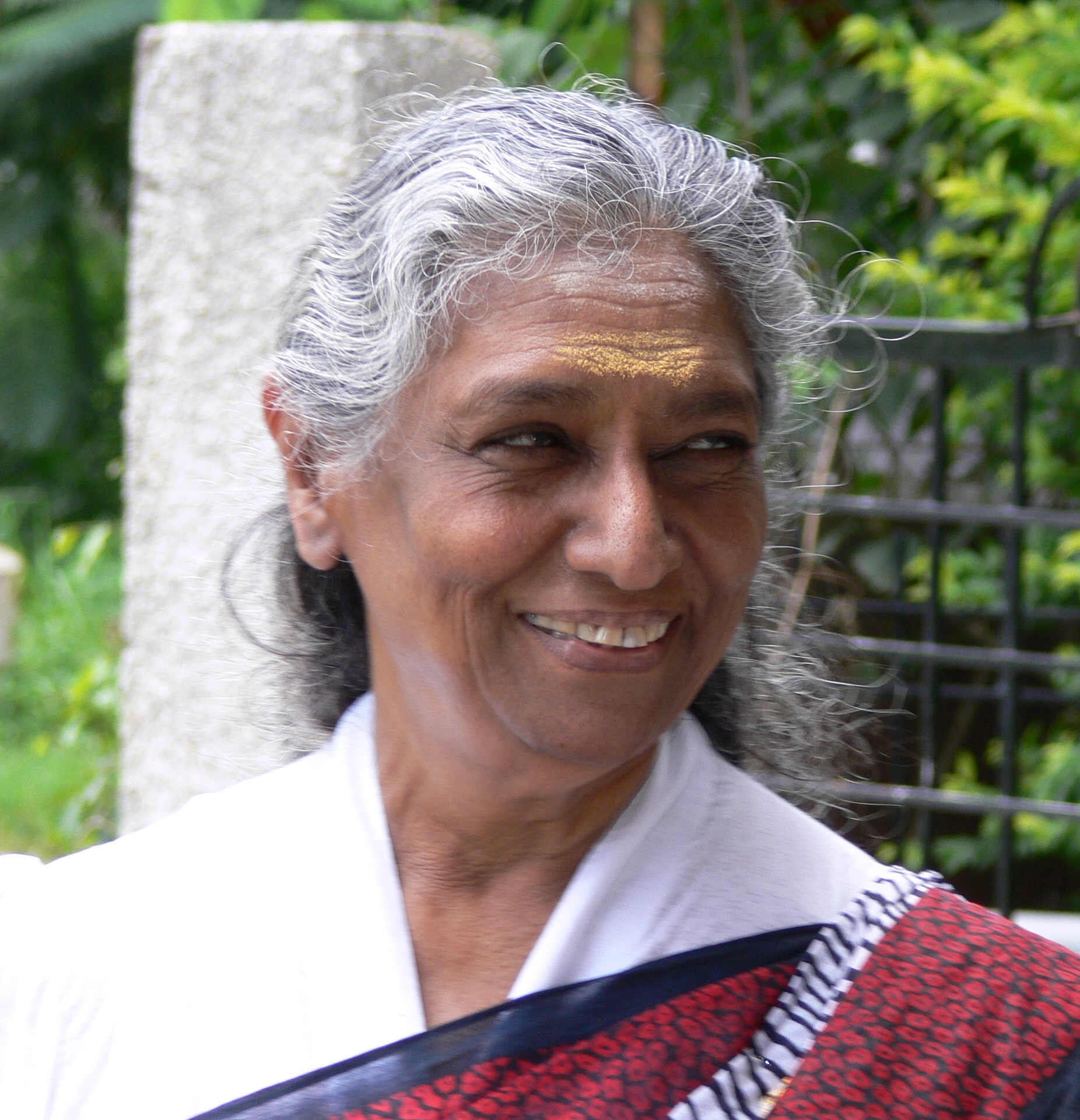
S. Janaki in Pune, India 2007

S. Janaki has won four National Film Awards and 33 different State Film Awards. Widely acclaimed as one of the most versatile singers, her association with singer S. P. Balasubrahmanyam and composer Ilaiyaraaja is well known. In the 1960s, 1970s and 1980s her duets with P. B. Srinivas, S. P. Balasubrahmanyam and with Dr. Rajkumar were some of the most romantic duets in the history of Tamil, Telugu and Kannada film music.

In 2013, she refused to accept Padma Bhushan, the third-highest civilian award of the Government of India, saying that it had come "too late" and that South Indian artists were not given their due recognition.
